Freda Diesing (2 June 1925 – 4 December 2002) was a Haida woman of the Sadsugohilanes Clan, one of very few female carvers of Northwest Coast totem poles and a member of the Council of the Haida Nation of British Columbia, Canada.

Early life and education
She was born Marie Alfreda Johnson in Prince Rupert, B.C., on 2 June 1925. She studied painting at the Vancouver School of Art and was one of the first students at the Gitanmaax School of Northwest Coast Indian Art ('Ksan) at Hazelton, B.C., in Gitksan territory.  There she received instruction from the art historian Bill Holm, and the First Nations artists Tony Hunt (Kwakwaka'wakw) and Robert Davidson (Haida).

Artwork
Diesing began her carving career when she was 42 years old using traditional formline design. She carved portrait masks and bowls as well as totem poles.  She designed ceremonial button blankets and carved wall panels for the Prince Rupert General Hospital. She was part of the major revival in Northwest Coast art in the 1960s.

Her poles include two poles raised at the Tsimshian community of Kitsumkalum near Terrace, B.C., with the assistance of a Tsimshian team, a 1987 pole for the RCMP station in Terrace, and poles in Prince Rupert.

Legacy and awards
Diesing was a master carver, painter, educator and champion of First Nations art and culture.  Her students include acclaimed artists Dempsey Bob, Norman Tait, her nephew Don Yeomans, and many others.  She lived in Terrace in her later years, and can be credited with instructing numerous students throughout the Pacific Northwest.

Diesing has received many honors and awards. She was recognized by the National Aboriginal Achievement Foundation, now Indspire, who awarded her the National Aboriginal Achievement Award in Winnipeg in March 2002. She received an honorary doctorate from the University of Northern British Columbia in May 2002. In 2006, Coast Mountain College created the Freda Diesing School of Northwest Coast Art, located in Terrace, British Columbia and named in her honor.

She has served as artist-in-residence in the Dominican Republic and participated in sculpture symposia in Finland.

Exhibitions
2019 Hearts of Our People: Native Women Arts. Minneapolis Institute of Art, Minneapolis, Minnesota.

1998 Down from the shimmering sky: masks of the Northwest Coast.  Vancouver Art Gallery, Vancouver, British Columbia.

1996 Topographies: aspects of recent B.C. art. Vancouver Art Gallery, Vancouver, British Columbia.

1994 Spirit Faces.  Inuit Art Gallery, Vancouver, British Columbia.

1993 Art of the mask: works from the Peacock Collection. Thunder Bay Art Gallery, Thunder Bay

Notes

References
 Macnair, Peter L., Alan L. Hoover, and Kevin Neary (1984) The Legacy: Tradition and Innovation in Northwest Coast Indian Art.  Vancouver, B.C.: Douglas & McIntyre.
 Stewart, Hilary (1993)  Looking at Totem Poles.  Vancouver, B.C.: Douglas & McIntyre.Hill, Richard, William J. Rushing, and Roger Matuz. St. James Guide to Native North American Artists. Detroit [Mich.: St. James Press, 1998.
Ahlberg, Yohe J, and Teri Greeves. Hearts of Our People. Native Women Artists. Seattle: University of Washington Press, 2019.
Hill, Richard, William J. Rushing, and Roger Matuz. St. James Guide to Native North American Artists. Detroit [Mich.: St. James Press, 1998.

External links
Biographical information, Terrace BC library

1925 births
2002 deaths
People from Prince Rupert, British Columbia
Haida woodcarvers
Canadian women artists
Canadian woodcarvers
20th-century First Nations sculptors
Indspire Awards
Women woodcarvers
20th-century Canadian women artists
First Nations women artists